Heston and Isleworth was a constituency between 1945 and 1974 for the House of Commons of the UK Parliament.  It contained Heston, Hounslow, Isleworth and Osterley in Middlesex which became parts of outer west London in 1965. 

Its candidates returned were Conservative except for siding with the Labour Party's landslide victory which returned the Attlee Ministry (in 1945).  Conservative Richard Reader Harris saw a slim 2.25% majority at the 1966 election which saw the start of the Second Wilson Ministry.

Components
The Borough of Heston and Isleworth wards of Heston, Hounslow Central, Hounslow South, Hounslow West, Isleworth North, Isleworth South, and Spring Grove.

Profile
The core of the two towns Hounslow and Isleworth became urban before the 19th century along with the intended senior Army officer's retirement estate of Spring Grove which adjoins Isleworth and the village centre of Heston in the north-west.  Two major green tracts, part-farmland and part-ornamental skirted the seat, Osterley Park (its House being the former home of the Earl of Jersey) and Syon Park (its House being the metropolitan home of the Duke of Northumberland).  They were adjoined by small rows of grand urban homes and high-attainment schools.

The area has a brief Thames riverside by largely Georgian Old Isleworth facing the international botanical centre of excellence Kew Gardens and one medieval Middlesex village hubs at Heston.  The bulk of the centre and west of the seat developed into housing in the 20th century, with small parks and allotments and ending in barren, stony Hounslow Heath to the west, with many transport depots and light industrial uses. Late additions include groups of tower blocks in the northern extreme of Heston, centre of Hounslow and east of Mogden Sewage Treatment Works all erected during the short life of the seat.  By contrast the inter-war houses and green low-rise-biased flats at Osterley, Heston, Woodlands, New Brentford and Hounslow are connected to within 40 minutes of Central London variously by the Hounslow Loop Line or the Piccadilly Line and were built for a London commuter belt middle class market in a range of styles.  The age of the automobile and aeroplane began while Heston and Isleworth was a seat. The Great West Road was a by-pass to Brentford that became a western artery and was the catalyst for mass ribbon-development of wider-fronted housing as well as of large manufacturing buildings. The popular private offer for the "commuter" generation was pairs of semi-detached houses in ’Tudorbethan’ or vernacular style, with wider windows and usually simple hipped roofs. Council housing with layouts based on Garden City ideals, and linear but edge-defining developments of flats continued until the mid-1970s.

Members of Parliament

Elections

Elections in the 1940s

Elections in the 1950s

Elections in the 1960s

Elections in the 1970s

References 

Parliamentary constituencies in London (historic)
Constituencies of the Parliament of the United Kingdom established in 1945
Constituencies of the Parliament of the United Kingdom disestablished in 1974
Politics of the London Borough of Hounslow
Isleworth